Peyton Tucker Reed (born July 3, 1964) is an American television and film director. He directed the comedy films Bring It On, Down with Love, The Break-Up, and Yes Man, as well as the superhero film Ant-Man and its sequels.

Background
Reed was born in Raleigh, North Carolina and attended the University of North Carolina at Chapel Hill, graduating in 1987 with a degree in English and Radio, Television & Motion Pictures. He was a DJ for WXYC, the UNC student radio station, while enrolled at the university. He worked as a van driver on the set of Bull Durham in 1987, which was partially filmed in Raleigh.

Film 
Reed's directorial debut, the motion picture Bring It On, was a number one box office hit. He also directed Down with Love, and The Break-Up; all comedy films. He has also acted in small roles in some films including his own and has written a few original songs for his soundtracks. He has also produced a few music videos.

Peyton Reed was originally set to direct the 20th Century Fox production Fantastic Four, before departing the project and being replaced by director Tim Story.

Reed directed the 2008 film Yes Man, starring Jim Carrey. Yes Man is an adaptation of Danny Wallace's autobiography about his decision to say "yes" to whatever offer, invitation, challenge, or opportunity that is presented to him.

Reed replaced Edgar Wright as the director of Ant-Man. Prior to joining the production of Ant-Man, Reed was slated to direct a Brian Epstein biopic, based on the graphic novel The Fifth Beatle. However, his commitment to the superhero film required him to part ways with The Fifth Beatle. Reed then went on to direct Ant-Man and the Wasp, the sequel to Ant-Man. He also directed the third Ant-Man film, Ant-Man and the Wasp: Quantumania.

Reed directed two episodes from the second season of the Disney+ series The Mandalorian, part of the Star Wars franchise.

Personal life

Reed lives in the Los Angeles area with his second wife Sheila Naghshineh and their two sons. He was previously married to Beth LaMure from 1998 to 2006. 

He plays in the band Cardinal Family Singers with Norwood Cheek. The band has released three albums, and their instrumental song "Tilting Scale" is featured in Ant-Man and the Wasp.

Filmography
Film
 Bring It On (2000)
 Down with Love (2003)
 The Break-Up (2006)
 Yes Man (2008)
 Ant-Man (2015)
 Ant-Man and the Wasp (2018)
 Ant-Man and the Wasp: Quantumania (2023)

Television

Commercials
 "Pretty Khaki" (for GAP, February 28, 2005)

Reception

References

External links

Photograph (at The Break-Up premiere)
Digitally Obsessed Interview
MoviePoopShoot.com Interview (for Down With Love)
DVDFile.com Interview (for Bring It On)
BTTF.com Interview (for the Back to the Future documentary)

1964 births
American male screenwriters
American television directors
Comedy film directors
Living people
University of North Carolina at Chapel Hill alumni
Film directors from North Carolina
American music video directors
Musicians from North Carolina
People from Chapel Hill, North Carolina
People from Raleigh, North Carolina